Spider is a 2007 Australian black comedy short film directed by Nash Edgerton and written by David Michôd and Nash Edgerton. The film had its world premiere in competition at the Sydney Film Festival on 17 June 2007. After that the film compete at number of film festivals and later theatrically released with Edgerton's feature-film The Square.

Plot 
A couple, Jack and Jill, are driving in a car. Jill is angry at Jack, so he enters a gas station and buys a card, flowers, chocolate, and a toy spider. As Jill re-fills the gas tank, Jack hides the spider in the sun visor above her seat. Jill ignores the flowers and card but is won over by the chocolate. She pulls down the sun visor, causing the spider to fall out and the car to nearly crash. After the car stops, Jack laughs and tosses the spider towards Jill, who jolts backwards into the road and is struck by a passing vehicle. Paramedics arrive, and as one is about to insert a syringe into the unconscious Jill's arm, he is startled by the spider toy and accidentally throws the syringe into Jack's eye.

Cast
Nash Edgerton as Jack
Mirrah Foulkes as Jill
Chum Ehelepola as Gas Station Attendant
Bruno Xavier as Gas Station Attendant
David Michôd as Hit Driver
Tony Lynch as Paramedic
Joel Edgerton as Paramedic

Reception

Critical response
The film earned mainly positive reviews from critics. Jason Sondhi of short of the week gave film the positive review said "It’s for sure a superior film, I just think I loved everything about it except the parts that I assume everyone loves." David Brook of blue print review gave the film four out of five stars and said "A simple one-gag comedy-short that works surprisingly well due to some accomplished naturalistic direction and performances. A nice touch at the end, although unnecessary, went down well with the audience too." Wesley Morris of Boston.com said that "as well-delivered as its shocks are, this film is cleverness in the service of cruelty."

Home media
Spider was released on DVD with The Square, on  24 August 2010.

Awards and official selections
 Official Selection - Melbourne International Film Festival 
 Official Selection - Telluride Film Festival
 Official Selection - South by Southwest

Notes
Edgerton directed a follow up of Spider, a short film entitled Bear which was released in 2011.

See also
 Cinema of Australia
 The Square
 Bear

References

External links 
 

2007 short films
2007 films
Australian comedy short films
Australian independent films
2007 independent films
Australian black comedy films
Australian action adventure films
2000s English-language films
Films directed by Nash Edgerton